Meadow Valley is a census-designated place (CDP) in Plumas County, California, United States. The population was 453 at the 2020 census, down from 464 at the 2010 census.

Geography
Meadow Valley is located at  (39.936921, -121.062051).

Climate
This region experiences warm (but not hot) and dry summers, with no average monthly temperatures above 71.6 °F.  According to the Köppen Climate Classification system, Meadow Valley has a warm-summer Mediterranean climate, abbreviated "Csb" on climate maps.

Demographics

2010
The 2010 United States Census reported that Meadow Valley had a population of 464. The racial makeup of Meadow Valley was 435 (93.8%) White, 0 (0.0%) African American, 13 (2.8%) Native American, 0 (0.0%) Asian, 0 (0.0%) Pacific Islander, 4 (0.9%) from other races, and 12 (2.6%) from two or more races. Hispanic or Latino of any race were 21 persons (4.5%).

The Census reported that 464 people (100% of the population) lived in households, 0 (0%) lived in non-institutionalized group quarters, and 0 (0%) were institutionalized.

There were 231 households, out of which 41 (17.7%) had children under the age of 18 living in them, 115 (49.8%) were opposite-sex married couples living together, 7 (3.0%) had a female householder with no husband present, 5 (2.2%) had a male householder with no wife present.  There were 15 (6.5%) unmarried opposite-sex partnerships, and 0 (0%) same-sex married couples or partnerships. 82 households (35.5%) were made up of individuals, and 39 (16.9%) had someone living alone who was 65 years of age or older. The average household size was 2.01.  There were 127 families (55.0% of all households); the average family size was 2.62.

The population was spread out, with 62 people (13.4%) under the age of 18, 25 people (5.4%) aged 18 to 24, 84 people (18.1%) aged 25 to 44, 201 people (43.3%) aged 45 to 64, and 92 people (19.8%) who were 65 years of age or older.  The median age was 52.4 years. For every 100 females, there were 106.2 males.  For every 100 females age 18 and over, there were 104.1 males.

The homeowner vacancy rate was 3.4%; the rental vacancy rate was 3.2%.  351 people (75.6% of the population) lived in owner-occupied housing units and 113 people (24.4%) lived in rental housing units.

2000
As of the census of 2000, there were 575 people, 263 households, and 173 families residing in the CDP. The racial makeup of the CDP was 94.26% White, 0.17% African American, 3.13% Native American, 0.17% Asian, 0.70% from other races, and 1.57% from two or more races. Hispanic or Latino of any race were 4.17% of the population.

There were 263 households, out of which 25.9% had children under the age of 18 living with them, 55.5% were married couples living together, 6.8% had a female householder with no husband present, and 34.2% were non-families. 28.1% of all households were made up of individuals, and 10.3% had someone living alone who was 65 years of age or older.  The average household size was 2.19 and the average family size was 2.66.

In the CDP, the population was spread out, with 21.2% under the age of 18, 5.0% from 18 to 24, 25.4% from 25 to 44, 33.4% from 45 to 64, and 15.0% who were 65 years of age or older.  The median age was 44 years. For every 100 females, there were 113.0 males.  For every 100 females age 18 and over, there were 106.8 males.

The median income for a household in the CDP was $33,571, and the median income for a family was $45,469. Males had a median income of $40,000 versus $30,667 for females. The per capita income for the CDP was $19,726.  About 10.6% of families and 11.5% of the population were below the poverty line, including 9.8% of those under age 18 and 9.0% of those age 65 or over.

Politics

References

Census-designated places in Plumas County, California
Census-designated places in California